Struthers Lake is a small lake situated in the aspen parkland of Saskatchewan, Canada. It is south of Weldon, Saskatchewan, and north of Yellow Creek, Saskatchewan. The lake contains northern pike and walleye. It also hosts a small regional park with swimming, boating, cabin, and camping facilities.

See also
List of lakes of Saskatchewan

References

External links
Struthers Lake Regional Park website

Invergordon No. 430, Saskatchewan
Lakes of Saskatchewan
Division No. 15, Saskatchewan